Yuxi is a town in Daozhen Gelao and Miao Autonomous County, Guizhou, China.

Administrative division
As of 2016, the town is divided into eight villages: 
 Chengguan
 Bayu
 Chi
 Songjiang
 Dalu
 Panxi
 Wuba
 Tuchengba

Geography

Furong River, Mei River, Bayu Stream, Yu Stream, Pan Stream, Shuicun Stream flow through the town.

Climate

Economy
The economy is supported primarily by farming, ranching and mineral resources. Mineral resources include phosphate iron, hematite, coal line, glass, granite, calcite, silica, manganese, etc.

Tourist attractions
The main attractions are the Yundingshan Scenic Spot, Shaba Reservoir, Songjiang Rafting, and Songjiang Hot Spring.

Panxi Temple is a Buddhist temple located in the town, which was originally built in the Yuan dynasty (1271–1368).

Wantian Palace is a Taoist temple built in the Daoguang period (1821–1850) of the Qing dynasty (1644–1911), which has been designated as a provincial key cultural unit.

References

Bibliography

Towns of Zunyi